Patriarch John V may refer to:

 Patriarch John V of Alexandria, Greek Patriarch of Alexandria in 610–619
 Patriarch John V of Constantinople, ruled in 669–675
 Patriarch John V of Antioch, a designation contended among various people; see John of Antioch
 John V, various Maronite Patriarchs